Marianne Bernard (12 February 1839, in Bristol – 9 April 1926, in Bristol) was  Mistress of Girton College, Cambridge from 1875 until 1884.

Bernard was  educated at the Home and Colonial Training College. from 1910 until 1925. Her appointment as Mistress was not unanimously welcomed within Girton,  as some felt her social position had swayed the decision: her maternal uncle was the Viceroy of India from 1864 to 1869. She left in 1884 to marry Peter Wallwork Latham, Downing professor of medicine at Cambridge.

References

1839 births
1926 deaths
Alumni of the Home and Colonial Training College
Mistresses of Girton College, Cambridge
Academics from Bristol
19th-century English educators
English women educators
19th-century women educators
19th-century English women